Jahleel Weaver (born 1987) is an American fashion designer, stylist, and deputy creative director of Rihanna's fashion house, Fenty.

Career 
Weaver's first styling job was for Vogue Italia, where he assisted with styling Usher. He then worked as assistant stylist alongside Mel Ottenberg, who has been styling singer Rihanna since 2005. In 2014, when Rihanna launched fashion house Fenty, she asked Weaver to work for her directly. Since then, he has been Rihanna's full-time stylist and the official creative director at Fenty.

Personal life 
The designer grew up in the suburbs of Maryland to Jamaican-Panamanian immigrants. His mother worked for a law firm and his dad owns a funeral home. Weaver lives in East Village, New York. He is gay.

References 

Living people
American fashion designers
Rihanna
LGBT fashion designers
LGBT people from Maryland
1987 births